Andropromachus is a  genus of Asian stick insects in the tribe Necrosciini, erected by Johann Carl in 1913.  Species have been recorded from south-western China and northern Vietnam.

Species
The Phasmida Species File lists:
 Andropromachus bicolor (Kirby, 1904)
 Andropromachus guangxiense (Chen & He, 2000)
 Andropromachus gulinqingensis Xie & Qian, 2022
 Andropromachus scutatus Carl, 1913 - type species
 Andropromachus tonkinensis (Brunner von Wattenwyl, 1907)
 Andropromachus ynau Gao, Huang, Wang, Xie & Li, 2022

References

External links

Phasmatodea genera
Phasmatodea of Asia
Lonchodidae